The Brooklyn-Guernsey-Malcom (BGM) Community School District, or BGM Community School, serves the towns of Brooklyn, Guernsey and Malcom and surrounding areas in eastern Poweshiek County, Iowa.

The school, which serves all grade levels PreK-12 in one building, is located at 1090 Jackson Street in Brooklyn.

The BGM Community and H-L-V Community School Districts have a shared learning agreement.

The school's mascot is the Bears. Their colors are red and royal blue.

Schools
The district operates two schools in a single facility in Brooklyn:
Brooklyn-Guernsey-Malcom Elementary School
Brooklyn-Guernsey-Malcom Junior-Senior High School

Brooklyn-Guernsey-Malcom Junior-Senior High School

Athletics 
The Bears compete in the South Iowa Cedar League Conference in the following sports:

Cross Country (boys and girls)
 Boys' State Champions - 1970
 Girls' State Champions - 1969, 1970, 1971, 1983 
Volleyball
Football
Basketball (boys and girls)
Wrestling (boys and girls)
Track and Field (boys and girls)
Golf (boys and girls)
Baseball (boys)
Softball (girls)

See also
List of school districts in Iowa
List of high schools in Iowa

References

External links
 BGM Community School

Education in Poweshiek County, Iowa
School districts in Iowa
School districts established in 1960
1960 establishments in Iowa